The Olympus PEN E-PL6 is a digital rangefinder-style mirrorless interchangeable lens camera in the Micro Four Thirds system. It was announced by Olympus Corporation on May 10, 2013. 
It succeeds the Olympus PEN E-PL5 and has itself been succeeded by the Olympus PEN E-PL7.

References
http://www.dpreview.com/products/olympus/slrs/oly_epl6/specifications

PEN E-PL6
Live-preview digital cameras
Cameras introduced in 2013